Anna Swenn-Larsson (born 18 June 1991) is a Swedish World Cup alpine ski racer who specialises in slalom. She made her World Cup debut in a slalom at Courchevel in December 2010 and placed 26th; her first podium came on home snow at Åre in March 2014.

Swenn-Larsson competed for Sweden in two Winter Olympics and four World Championships. She won a silver medal in slalom at the 2019 World Championships in Åre, and was fifth in slalom at the 2018 Winter Olympics in PyeongChang.

Her first World Cup victory came in November 2022 in a slalom at Killington, shared with Wendy Holdener.

World Cup results

Season standings

Race podiums
1 win – (1 SL) 
11 podiums – (9 SL, 2 PSL); 49 top tens

World Championship results

Olympic results

References

External links

Anna Swenn-Larsson at Head Skis

1991 births
Swedish female alpine skiers
Alpine skiers at the 2014 Winter Olympics
Alpine skiers at the 2018 Winter Olympics
Alpine skiers at the 2022 Winter Olympics
Olympic alpine skiers of Sweden
Living people
People from Mora Municipality
Sportspeople from Dalarna County
21st-century Swedish women